"Aural Psynapse" is an instrumental recording by Canadian electronic music producer Deadmau5. It was released on November 4, 2011 by Mau5trap and Ultra Records (US and Canada) and featured on his 2014 greatest hits album 5 Years of Mau5.

Background 
The original version of the track was recorded in 2001 and uploaded to SectionZ on June 17, 2002 under the alias Halcyon441 (Zimmerman's screen name at the time)  on the self-released compilation deadmau5 Circa 1998–2002.

Zimmerman previewed a remake in April 2011 through Ustream while it was a work in progress, noting it was originally "a track [he] made [...] ten years ago". The remake even uses a sample from the original 2001 release.

It was first played live in May 2011 during live in Malaysia and August 2011 during the Meowingtons Hax Tour.

Release 
The track was released on November 4, 2011. In December 2011, the song was featured in the tour Hard x Mouth Taped Shut. The song was also featured on the 2014 compilation album 5 years of mau5.

Track listing

Appearances 
The song "Aural Psynapse" from the 2001 version of the album Deadmau5 Circa 1998–2002 appears in the Miniclip game Little Rocketman.

Charts

Certifications

References 

2011 singles
Deadmau5 songs
Ultra Music singles
Songs written by Deadmau5
2002 songs